Her Sport (German: Ihr Sport) is a 1919 German silent comedy film directed by Rudolf Biebrach and starring Henny Porten, Georg H. Schnell and Hermann Thimig. A man-hating young woman tries to break up her friend's new marriage, but while in the Alps she meets her own ideal man.

It was shot at the Tempelhof Studios in Berlin.

Cast
 Henny Porten as Adelina von Gentz
 Georg H. Schnell as Rudolf Walters
 Hermann Thimig as Rudi Walters
 Wally Koch as Helga Walters
 Rudolf Biebrach

References

Bibliography
 Jung, Uli & Schatzberg, Walter. Beyond Caligari: The Films of Robert Wiene. Berghahn Books, 1999.

External links

1919 films
Films of the Weimar Republic
German silent feature films
German comedy films
Films directed by Rudolf Biebrach
German black-and-white films
UFA GmbH films
Films shot at Tempelhof Studios
Silent comedy films
1910s German films